The Melges 32 is an American sailboat that was designed by Reichel/Pugh as a one-design racer and first built in 2004.

The design is an accepted World Sailing international class.

Production
The design has been built by Melges Performance Sailboats in the United States, since 2004, with 230 boats completed and remains in production. It was also at one time built by SOCA Sailboats of Laventille, Trinidad and Tobago.

Design

The Melges 32 is a racing keelboat, built predominantly of composite material. It has a 7/8 fractional sloop rig with dual swept spreaders, a keel-stepped mast and carbon fiber spars. The hull is built from fiberglass reinforced epoxy and a PVC fiberglass epoxy sandwich. The hull has a nearly-plumb stem, an open reverse transom, an internally mounted spade-type rudder controlled by a tiller and a retractable carbon fiber lifting keel with a lead bulb weight. It displaces  and carries  of lead ballast.

With it retracted the boat can be operated in shallow water or transported on a boat trailer.

The boat is normally fitted with a small  outboard motor for docking and maneuvering.

Operational history
The boat is supported by an active class club that organizes racing events, the International Melges 32 Class Association.

Events

See also
List of sailing boat types

References

External links

Melges 32
Keelboats
2000s sailboat type designs
Sailing yachts
One-design sailing classes
Classes of World Sailing
Sailboat type designs by Reichel/Pugh
Sailboat types built by Melges Performance Sailboats
Sailboat types built by SOCA Sailboats